Charles Herbert Pierrepont, 2nd Earl Manvers (11 August 1778 – 27 October 1860) was an English nobleman and naval officer, the second son of Charles Pierrepont, 1st Earl Manvers.

Naval career
In her he captured the Lynx of 10 guns and 70 men, and also:
 On 15 September 1797 he captured the French privateer lugger Espoir of 2 guns and 39 men.
She surrendered, having 9 men killed and wounded, while Kingsfisher had only 1 man wounded.
 On 26 May 1798 off Vigo, he captured the Spanish privateer lugger Avantivia Ferrolina, mounting one long gun and four swivels, with a crew of 26.

He was promoted to post-captain into the 74-gun  on 24 December 1798, and Kingfisher was taken over by his former first lieutenant, Frederick Maitland. Pierrepont returned to England in July 1799. He was subsequently appointed to the 40-gun frigate , but resigned his command following the death of his elder brother Evelyn in October 1801. He officially retired from the Navy in 1803.

Political career
Pierrepont took over his brother's seat as Member of Parliament for Nottinghamshire. He became a deputy lieutenant of the county in 1803. In 1806, his father was created Earl Manvers, and Charles was styled Viscount Newark. He remained an MP until 1816, when he succeeded to the Earldom.

Family
He married Mary Laetitia Eyre, of Grove Hall, Nottinghamshire (1784–1860), in 1804. They had four children:
 Charles Evelyn Pierrepont, Viscount Newark (1805–1850), MP for East Retford, 1830–1835.
 Sydney William Herbert Pierrepont, 3rd Earl Manvers (1825–1900)
 Lady Mary Frances Pierrepont (d. 1905), married Edward Christopher Egerton in 1845
 Lady Annora Charlotte Pierrepont (d. 1888), married Charles Watkin Williams-Wynn in 1853

See also
 Thoresby Hall
 Holme Pierrepont Hall

References

External links 
 

1778 births
1860 deaths
Earls in the Peerage of the United Kingdom
Newark, Charles Herbert Pierrepont, Viscount
Royal Navy officers
Royal Navy personnel of the Napoleonic Wars
Newark, Charles Herbert Pierrepont, Viscount
Newark, Charles Herbert Pierrepont, Viscount
Newark, Charles Herbert Pierrepont, Viscount
Newark, Charles Herbert Pierrepont, Viscount
Newark, Charles Herbert Pierrepont, Viscount
Manvers, E2
Deputy Lieutenants of Nottinghamshire
Charles